Insular is an adjective used to describe:
 An island
 Someone who is isolated and parochial

Insular may also refer to:

Sub-national territories or regions
 Insular Chile
 Insular region of Colombia
 Insular Ecuador, administratively known as Galápagos Province
 Insular Region (Equatorial Guinea)
 Insular Italy
 Insular Portugal, comprises the Madeira and Azores Autonomous Regions
 Insular Southeast Asia
 Insular areas of the United States
 Insular Cases, a series of U.S. Supreme Court decisions in 1901, about the status of U.S. territories acquired in the Spanish–American War
 Bureau of Insular Affairs, a unit of the U.S. government's War Department which administered certain insular areas from 1902 to 1939
 Office of Insular Affairs, a unit of the U.S. Department of the Interior that oversees federal administration of several insular areas (and the successor to the Bureau of Insular Affairs).
 Insular Government of the Philippine Islands, the U.S. territorial government that was established in 1901 and was dissolved in 1935
 Insular Region, Venezuela

Periods of political isolation
 Berlin, while isolated by the Berlin Wall, from 1961 to 1989
 China, after 1422 until the 19th century
 Japan, during most of the Tokugawa shogunate (1603-1868), when the Seclusion laws were in place
 South Africa during apartheid, between 1948 and 1993

Other uses
 Insular (Insulares), the term used for criollos in the former Spanish East Indies (the Philippines, the Mariana Islands, the Caroline Islands)
 Insular art, the style of art produced in the post-Roman history of the British Isles
 Insular Celts, the Iron Age inhabitants of the British Isles
 Insular Celtic languages, the group of languages spoken by those people
 Insular Christianity, more commonly known as Celtic Christianity
 insular cortex, a part of the cerebral cortex
 Insular dwarfism, a form of phyletic dwarfism
 Insular script, a medieval script system originally used in Ireland
 Insular Life, a mutual life insurance company in the Philippines

See also
 
 
 Maritime (disambiguation)